Narenjkol (also Romanized as Nārenjkol; also known as Tārīkh Gal) is a village in Lakan Rural District, in the Central District of Rasht County, Gilan Province, Iran. At the 2006 census, its population was 129, in 38 families.

References 

Populated places in Rasht County